Joseph Haverty (17 February 1936 – 7 February 2009) was an Irish footballer who played as a winger. He was capped 32 times for the Republic of Ireland.

Career
Haverty played for Home Farm and St Patrick's Athletic before signing for Arsenal in July 1954. He almost immediately made his debut, while still only 18, against Everton on 25 August 1954, though he only managed another six matches that season, and eight the one after that.

His breakthrough in the Arsenal side came in 1956–57, as he became the Gunners' first choice left-winger, playing 32 times and scoring 9 goals. By now he had also made his debut for the Republic of Ireland, against the Netherlands on 10 May 1955.

Haverty also played in the London XI that contested the inaugural edition of the Inter-Cities Fairs Cup. He played against Lausanne Sports in the semi-finals (and scored a goal in the 3–2 aggregate win), he did not make the cut for the final against Barcelona, which London lost 6–1 on aggregate.

Back trouble meant he missed some of Arsenal's matches during this time, but put in 37 appearances and 8 goals in 1959–60, his best season for the club. However, the next season he was made to share the left wing position with Alan Skirton. Haverty was unhappy with the lack of a regular first-team place, and put in a transfer request; he was sold to Blackburn Rovers in August 1961 for £25,000. In all, he played 122 matches for Arsenal, scoring 26 goals.

Haverty spent a single season with Blackburn, before having spells in the lower divisions with Millwall and Bristol Rovers, with a brief spell at Celtic in between. He moved back to his native Ireland to play for Shelbourne, with whom he won the last of his 32 full international caps. In 1967 he went to the United States to play for Chicago Spurs (later Kansas City Spurs) in the NASL, and then returned to sign for Shamrock Rovers in 1969, for whom he made two appearances in the European Cup Winners' Cup. In August 1971 he signed for Drogheda.

He went on to scout for Arsenal in Ireland. In 2000, he was inaugurated into the Football Association of Ireland's Hall of Fame. He died on 7 February 2009, in Dublin, aged 72.

Honours
 Football Association of Ireland Hall of Fame: 2000

References

1936 births
2009 deaths
Association footballers from County Dublin
Republic of Ireland association footballers
Republic of Ireland international footballers
Association football wingers
Home Farm F.C. players
St Patrick's Athletic F.C. players
Arsenal F.C. players
Blackburn Rovers F.C. players
Millwall F.C. players
Celtic F.C. players
Bristol Rovers F.C. players
Shelbourne F.C. players
Chicago Spurs players
Kansas City Spurs players
Drumcondra F.C. players
Shamrock Rovers F.C. players
Drogheda United F.C. players
League of Ireland players
English Football League players
Scottish Football League players
North American Soccer League (1968–1984) players
London XI players